Patrick Donohoe VC (1820 – 16 August 1876) was an Irish recipient of the Victoria Cross.

Details
He was approximately 37 years old and a private in the 9th Lancers, British Army during the Indian Mutiny when the following deed took place on 28 September 1857, at Bolandshahr, India, for which he was awarded the VC:

Further information
Born at Nenagh, County Tipperary, Ireland. His death certificate records that he died at Bride Street, Dublin, on 16 August 1876 and he was buried in Glasnevin Cemetery.

References

Listed in order of publication year 
The Register of the Victoria Cross (1981, 1988 and 1997)
The Irish Sword (Brian Clarke, 1986)
Ireland's VCs (Dept of Economic Development, 1995)
Monuments to Courage (David Harvey, 1999)
Irish Winners of the Victoria Cross (Richard Doherty & David Truesdale, 2000)

1820 births
1876 deaths
Irish soldiers in the British Army
19th-century Irish people
People from Nenagh
9th Queen's Royal Lancers soldiers
Irish recipients of the Victoria Cross
Indian Rebellion of 1857 recipients of the Victoria Cross
British Army recipients of the Victoria Cross
Military personnel from County Tipperary